The inferior third of the medial border of the humerus is raised into a slight ridge, the medial supracondylar ridge (or  medial supracondylar line), which becomes very prominent below; it presents an anterior lip for the origins of the Brachialis and Pronator teres, a posterior lip for the medial head of the Triceps brachii, and an intermediate ridge for the attachment of the medial intermuscular septum.

References

External links
 
 Image at u-szeged.hu

Humerus